Warboys and Wistow Woods is a  biological Site of Special Scientific Interest north of Warboys and west of Wistow in Cambridgeshire. Wistow Wood is an  nature reserve owned and managed by the Wildlife Trust for Bedfordshire, Cambridgeshire and Northamptonshire.

These woods have high conservation value because they are ancient ash and maple, and this habitat has sharply declined in extent since 1945. The woods have diverse flora and fauna, particularly invertebrates.

There is access to Wistow Wood from Wistow Fen Lane, but Warboys Wood is private land with no public access.

References

External links 
 

Sites of Special Scientific Interest in Cambridgeshire
Wildlife Trust for Bedfordshire, Cambridgeshire and Northamptonshire reserves